London 2 North West is an English rugby union league which is at the seventh tier of club rugby union in England and is made up of teams predominantly from north-west London and Hertfordshire. When this division began in 1987 it was known as London 3 North West, changing to its current name ahead of the 2009–10 season.

Promotion is usually to London 1 North with the league champions going up automatically and the runners up entering a promotion playoff against the league runners up from London 2 North East, however those clubs based in London rather than the Home Counties are sometimes promoted to London 1 South. Relegated teams typically drop into London 3 North West.  Each year all clubs in the division also take part in the RFU Intermediate Cup - a level 7 national competition.

Teams for 2021–22

The teams competing in 2021-22 achieved their places in the league based on performances in 2019–20, the 'previous season' column in the table below refers to that season not 2020–21.

Season 2020–21

On 30 October the RFU announced  that a decision had been taken to cancel Adult Competitive Leagues (National League 1 and below) for the 2020/21 season meaning London 2 North West was not contested.

Participating Clubs 2019–20

Participating Clubs 2018–19

Participating Clubs 2017–18

Participating Clubs 2016-17
Belsize Park (promoted from London 3 North West)
Enfield Ignatians 
H.A.C.
Hammersmith & Fulham
Hampstead
Harpenden
Harrow (relegated from London 1 North)
London Nigerian (promoted from London 3 North West)
Old Haberdashers
Stockwood Park 
Tabard
Welwyn

Participating Clubs 2015-16
Enfield Ignations (transferred from London 2 North East)
Fullerians (promoted from London 3 North West)
H.A.C.
Hammersmith & Fulham
Hampstead
Harpenden
Old Haberdashers
Old Merchant Taylors' 
Staines
Tabard
Welwyn (promoted from London 3 North West)
Woodford (relegated from London 1 North)

Participating Clubs 2014-15
Chiswick
H.A.C.
Hammersmith & Fulham
Hampstead
Harpenden
Harrow (promoted from London 3 North West)
Hemel Hempstead
Old Haberdashers
Old Merchant Taylors' (promoted from London 3 North West)
St Albans
Staines
Tabard (relegated from London 1 North)

Participating Clubs 2013-14
Beaconsfield (relegated from London 1 North)
Chiswick
H.A.C.
Hammersmith & Fulham
Hampstead
Harpenden
Hemel Hempstead
London Nigerian
Old Priorians (promoted from London 3 North West)
St Albans
Twickenham
U.C.S. Old Boys

Participating Clubs 2012-13
Chiswick
Fullerians
Grasshoppers	
H.A.C.
Hammersmith & Fulham (relegated from London 1 North)
Hampstead
Harpenden
Hemel Hempstead 
London Nigerian 	
St Albans
Tabard	
U.C.S. Old Boys

Original teams

When league rugby began in 1987 this division (known as London 3 North West) contained the following teams:

Bacavians
Bishop's Stortford
Fullerians
Harrow
Hendon
Kingsburians
Letchworth Garden City
Mill Hill
Old Paulines
Tabard
Twickenham

London 2 North West Honours

London 3 North West (1987–1993)

Originally known as London 3 North West, this division was a tier 7 league with promotion up to London 2 North and relegation down to either Hertfordshire 1 or Middlesex 1.

London 3 North West (1993–1996)

At the end of the 1992–93 season, the top six teams from London 1 and the top six from South West 1 were combined to create National 5 South.  This meant that London 3 North West dropped from a tier 7 league to a tier 8 league for the years that National 5 South was active.  Promotion continued to London 2 North, while relegation was to the newly introduced Herts/Middlesex.

London 3 North East (1996–2000)

The cancellation of National 5 South at the end of the 1995–96 season meant that London 3 North West reverted to being a tier 7 league.  Promotion continued to London 2 North, while relegation was to Herts/Middlesex 1 (formerly Herts/Middlesex).

London 3 North West (2000–2009)

London 3 North West continued to be a tier 7 league with promotion up to London 2 North.  However, the introduction of London 4 North West ahead of the 2000–01 season meant that clubs were now relegated into this new division instead of into Herts/Middlesex 1.

London 2 North East (2009–present)

Nationwide league restructuring by the RFU ahead of the 2009–10 season saw London 3 North West renamed as London 2 North West.  It remained at level 7 with promotion to London 1 North (formerly London 2 North) and relegation to London 3 North West (formerly London 4 North West).

Promotion play-offs
Since the 2000–01 season there has been a play-off between the runners-up of London 2 North East and London 2 North West for the third and final promotion place to London 1 North. The team with the superior league record has home advantage in the tie.  At the end of the 2019–20 season the London 2 North East and London 2 North West teams are tied on nine wins apiece, and the home team has won promotion on fourteen occasions compared to the away teams five.

Number of league titles

Hertford (3)
Tabard (3)
Harpenden (2)
Old Haberdashers (2)
Bank of England (1)
Belsize Park (1)
Bishop's Stortford (1)
Civil Service (1)
Finchley (1)
Fullerians (1)
Hammersmith & Fulham (1)
Harrow (1)
H.A.C. (1)
Letchworth Garden City (1)
London Nigerian (1)
London Scottish (1)
London Welsh (1)
Old Albanian (1)
Old Merchant Taylors' (1)
Old Priorians (1)
Ruislip (1)
St Albans (1)
Staines (1)
Stevenage Town (1)
Upper Clapton (1)
Verulamians (1)
Woodford (1)

See also
London & SE Division RFU
Hertfordshire RFU
Middlesex RFU
English rugby union system
Rugby union in England

Notes

References

7
3